Bruce Benamran (born  in Strasbourg) is a French YouTube personality mostly known for his French speaking popular science YouTube channel . He created his channel in August 2013, since then it has reached over one million subscribers (July 2018).

In 2016, he internationalised his concept by creating an English speaking channel called Get it.

Publications

References

French YouTubers
Mass media people from Strasbourg